Cumberland Railway may refer to:
Cumberland Railway and Coal Company and associated Cumberland Railway (Nova Scotia)
Cumberland Railway (1882), predecessor of the Southern Railway in Kentucky
Cumberland Railway (1902), predecessor of the Southern Railway in Kentucky and Tennessee
Cumberland Railway (Pennsylvania), an interurban trolley line in central Pennsylvania
Cumberland railway line, Sydney, Australia